Standings and results for Group 1 of the UEFA Euro 1984 qualifying tournament.

Group 1 consisted of Belgium, East Germany, Scotland and Switzerland. Group winners were Belgium, who finished 3 points clear of second-placed Switzerland.

Final table

Results

Goalscorers

References
UEFA Page
RSSSF

Group 1
1982–83 in Scottish football
1983–84 in Scottish football
1982–83 in East German football
1983–84 in East German football
1982–83 in Belgian football
1983–84 in Belgian football
Belgium at UEFA Euro 1984
1982–83 in Swiss football
1983–84 in Swiss football